Stadion Miejski im. Władysława Kawuli is a football stadium in Kraków, Poland.

Modernized in 2018, it is home to the sports club Prądniczanka Kraków. It has an artificial turf ground, and has 1,224 saeting capacity in roofed stand.

Poland national amputee football team played their mathces at the 2021 European Amputee Football Championship in this stadium.

References

Kraków
Sport in Kraków
Buildings and structures in Kraków
Sports venues in Lesser Poland Voivodeship